William Souder is an American journalist and author who won the Los Angeles Times Book Prize for Biography in 2021 and his book was the finalist for Pulitzer Prize for Biography or Autobiography. His book On A Farther Shore was listed in New York Times 100 Notable Books of 2012 and Top 25 Best Non-Fiction book in 2012 by Kirkus Reviews.

References 

Living people
Year of birth missing (living people)